This is a list of plants found in the Sierra de Manantlán Biosphere Reserve. The reserve straddles the Mexican states of Colima and Jalisco. It is located in the transition between the Nearctic and Neotropical realms and encompasses parts of the Sierra Madre del Sur, with a wide range of altitudes, climates and soils. The effects of tectonic and volcanic activities and erosion are notable within the reserve.

Ecological characteristics
Forest types in the reserve including mesophytic, cloud, dry deciduous and semi-deciduous tropical forests. Anthropologists know the region as Zona de Occidente, an area notably different to the rest of Mesoamerica. Some ceramic remnants, figurines and graves have been found, but there is little other material evidence of ancient human settlement. As of 1995 almost 8,000 people lived in the Sierra de Manantlán Reserve, engaged mainly in agriculture (corn, beans, tomatoes, sugar cane, watermelon, mangoes), livestock grazing, timber production, and extraction of wood for fuel and mining of coal or minerals. Another 30,000 lived in the surrounding communities and almost 700,000 in the surrounding region.

The Sierra de Manantlán Biosphere Reserve is located to the extreme north of the inter-tropical zone. The climate in the region is influenced by its proximity to the coast, the effect of its landform (orographic shade) and the breadth of its altitudinal range. These characteristics explain the high biodiversity and the presence of numerous plant formations ranging from tropical forests to temperate-cold climates.

The Sierra de Manantlán's varied and complex plant cover harbours a great wealth of flora. There are over 2900 species of vascular plants belonging to 981 genera. Wildlife is one of the important components of the high biodiversity in this reserve. Among the main values of the Sierra de Manantlán, in addition to its great wealth of species and its unique biogeographical characteristics, particular mention should be made of the presence of endangered or useful endemic species. So far 110 mammal species have been reported, including the Mexican vole subspecies Microtus mexicanus neveriae, the pocket gopher Cratogeomys gymnurus russelli, the oncilla, jaguarandi, ocelot, puma, bobcat, jaguar and four species of nectarivorous bats.

There are 336 bird species which have been reported, among them are 36 which are endemic to Mexico, such as the charismatic species: crested guan (Penelope purpurascens), military macaw (Ara militaris), red-lored amazon (Amazona autumnalis) and the Mexican national symbol, the golden eagle. In terms of herpetofauna, 85 species have been recorded; of these 13 are endemic to the western and central region of Mexico: rattlesnake, black iguana, frog Shyrrhopus modestus, beaded lizard (Heloderma horridum) and the Autlan rattlesnake (Crotalus lannomi), an endemic species only reported for the area of Puerto de Los Mazos. Of the 16 species of fish identified, 13 are native and four are endemic to the region.

Most plants in the list below can be found in Flora de Manantlán, and that should be assumed as a reference when no other is indicated. References to other sources are included where found. The herbarium web pages at the National Autonomous University of Mexico and at the Missouri Botanical Garden are used as authorities for names with adjustments for the system in use by Wikipedia. Species include ecosystem, growth habit, and common names where available.

Cycads

Zamiaceae
 Zamia loddigesii: a shrub or

Coniferae
Pines and their allies.

Cupressaceae

Cupressus

Pinaceae

Abies
 Abies guatemalensis: tree
 Abies religiosa: tree – cloud forest, pine-fir forest – sacred fir,

Pinus
 Pinus devoniana: tree
 Pinus douglasiana: tree – cloud forest, pine-oak forest, pine forest – 
 Pinus durangensis: tree
 Pinus herrerae: tree – pine-oak forest, pine forest – 
 Pinus leiophylla: tree
 Pinus maximinoi: tree – 
 Pinus montezumae: tree
 Pinus oocarpa: tree – pine-oak forest, pine forest

Podocarpaceae

Podocarpus
 Podocarpus matudae: tree

Monocotyledons or Liliopsida

Cyperaceae

Cyperus
 Cyperus hermaphroditus

Graminea or Poaceae

Festuca
 Festuca breviglumis

Liliaceae or Asparagaceae

Agave
 Agave maximiliana

Otatea
 Otatea acuminata – 
 Otatea aztecorum

Piptochaetium
 Piptochaetium virescens

Zea
 Zea diploperennis –

Smilacaceae

Smilax
 Smilax domingensis

Typhaceae

Typha
 Typha domingensis

Magnoliopsida or Dicotyledons
Flowering plants

Acanthaceae

Aphelandra
 Aphelandra lineariloba: shrub
 Aphelandra madrensis: shrub

Barleria
 Barleria micans: shrub

Dicliptera
 Dicliptera resupinata: herb

Dyschoriste
 Dyschoriste hirsutissima: herb – , 
 Dyschoriste saltuensis: herb
 Dyschoriste rubiginosa or D. angustifolia: herb

Elytraria
 Elytraria imbricata: herb

Henrya
 Henrya insularis: herb
 Henrya tuberculosperma: herb

Justicia or Jacobinia
 Jacobinia mexicana: herb
 Justicia aurea: herb
 Justicia candicans: herb
 Justicia reflexiflora: herb
 Justicia salviiflora: herb
 Justicia spicigera: herb

Pseuderanthemum
 Pseuderanthemum praecox: herb
 Pseuderanthemum standleyi: herb

Ruellia
 Ruellia bourgaei: shrub
 Ruellia jaliscana: shrub
 Ruellia mcvaughii: shrub
 Ruellia novogaliciana: shrub
 Ruellia spissa: herb
 Ruellia stemonacanthoides: herb

Tetramerium
 Tetramerium glandulosum: herb
 Tetramerium nervosum: herb
 Tetramerium tenuissimum: herb

Ruellia or Blechum
 Blechum brownei: herb

Actinidiaceae

Saurauia
 Saurauia serrata: tree –

Aizoaceae or Molluginaceae

Mollugo
 Mollugo verticillata

Trianthema
 Trianthema portulacastrum: herb

Amaranthaceae

Achyranthes
 Achyranthes aspera: herb –

Alternanthera
 Alternanthera achyrantha: herb

Amaranthus
 Amaranthus cruentus: herb
 Amaranthus hybridus: herb – 
 Amaranthus palmeri: herb – 
 Amaranthus polygonoides: herb
 Amaranthus spinosus: herb –

Celosia
 Celosia orcutti: herb

Chamissoa
 Chamissoa altissima: herb –

Froelichia
 Froelichia interrupta: herb

Gomphrena
 Gomphrena decumbens: herb

Iresine
 Iresine angustifolia: herb – 
 Iresine calea: herb
 Iresine cassiniiformis: herb
 Iresine diffusa: herb – 
 Iresine hartmanii: herb
 Iresine interrupta: herb – 
 Iresine nigra: herb –

Lagrezia
 Lagrezia monosperma: herb

Pleuropetalum
 Pleuropetalum sprucei: herb

Anacardiaceae

Amphipterygium
 Amphipterygium adstringens

Astronium
 Astronium graveolenss

Cyrtocarpa
 Cyrtocarpa procera

Pistacia
 Pistacia mexicana: tree –

Pseudosmodingium
 Pseudosmodingium perniciosum

Rhus
 Rhus pachyrrhachis
 Rhus schmidelioides
 Rhus terebinthifolia

Spondias
 Spondias purpurea: tree – ,

Toxicodendron
 Toxicodendron radicans: vine – 
 Toxicodendron radicans var. divaricatum: vine –

Apiaceae

Eryngium
 Eryngium palmeri

Annonaceae

Annona
 Annona cherimola: tree – 
 Annona longifolia: tree – 
 Annona muricata: tree – , 
 Annona squamosa: tree – sugar apple

Apocynaceae or Asclepiadaceae

Asclepias
 Asclepias angustifolia: herb
 Asclepias auriculata: herb
 Asclepias contrayerba: herb
 Asclepias crocea: herb
 Asclepias glaucescens: herb
 Asclepias mcvaughii: herb
 Asclepias ovata: herb – 
 Asclepias pellucida: herb
 Asclepias pringlei: herb
 Asclepias sp. nov.: herb

Blepharodon
 Blepharodon mucronatum: vine

Cryptostegia
 Cryptostegia grandiflora: vine – rubber vine,

Cynanchum
 Cynanchum foetidum: vine
 Cynanchum jaliscanum: vine
 Cynanchum ligulatum: vine
 Cynanchum unifarium: vine
 Cynanchum sp. nov.: vine

Funastrum
(Formerly Sarcostemma)
 Funastrum bilobum: vine
 Funastrum clausum: vine
 Funastrum elegans: vine
 Funastrum heterophyllum: vine
 Funastrum pannosum: vine

Gonolobus
 Gonolobus chloranthus: vine
 Gonolobus jaliscensis: vine
 Gonolobus macranthus: vine
 Gonolobus sp. nov. 1: vine
 Gonolobus sp. nov. 2: vine

Marsdenia
 Marsdenia astephanoides: vine
 Marsdenia lanata: vine
 Marsdenia mexicana: vine

Matelea
 Matelea aspera: vine
 Matelea balbisii: vine
 Matelea chrysantha: vine
 Matelea crenata: vine
 Matelea cyclophylla: vine
 Matelea dictyantha: vine
 Matelea pavonii: vine
 Matelea quirosii: vine
 Matelea sp.: vine
 Matelea sp. nov.: vine

Mellichampia
 Mellichampia sp.: vine

Metastelma
 Metastelma sp.: vine

Apocynaceae

Alstonia
 Alstonia longifolia: tree

Haplophyton
 Haplophyton cinereum: herb

Laubertia
 Laubertia contorta

Mandevilla
 Mandevilla andrieuxii: vine
 Mandevilla foliosa: vine
 Mandevilla subsagittata: vine
 Mandevilla syrinx: vine

Plumeria
 Plumeria obtusa: shrub – , 
 Plumeria rubra: shrub – ,

Prestonia
 Prestonia mexicana: shrub

Rauvolfia
 Rauvolfia canescens:
 Rauvolfia tetraphylla: shrub

Stemmadenia
 Stemmadenia donnell-smithii: shrub – 

Tabernaemontana
 Tabernaemontana alba: shrub

Thenardia
 Thenardia floribunda: tree

Thevetia
 Thevetia ovata: shrub

Vallesia
 Vallesia sp. nov.

Vinca
 Vinca major: perennial groundcover –

Aquifoliaceae

Ilex
 Ilex brandegeana: cloud forest
 Ilex tolucana: ivy

Araliaceae

Aralia
 Aralia humilis: tree –

Dendropanax
 Dendropanax arboreus: cloud forest

Oreopanax
 Oreopanax echinops: tree – 
 Oreopanax peltatus: tree
 Oreopanax santanderianus: tree
 Oreopanax xalapensis: tree – cloud forest

Aristolochiaceae

Aristolochia
 Aristolochia buntingii: vine
 Aristolochia foetida: vine
 Aristolochia malacophylla: vine
 Aristolochia styloglossa: vine – 
 Aristolochia taliscana: vine – , 
 Aristolochia tequilana: vine –

Balsaminaceae

Impatiens
 Impatiens balsamina: herb –

Basellaceae

Anredera
 Anredera vesicaria: vine

Begoniaceae

Begonia
 Begonia balmisiana: herb – 
 Begonia biserrata: herb
 Begonia calderonii: herb
 Begonia gracilis: annual herb
 Begonia heracleifolia: herb
 Begonia lachaoensis: herb
 Begonia monophylla: herb
 Begonia oaxacana: herb
 Begonia ornithophylla: herb
 Begonia plebeja: herb
 Begonia stigmosa: herb
 Begonia uruapensis: herb
 Begonia sp. 1: herb
 Begonia sp. 2: herb
 Begonia sp. 3: herb

Berberidaceae

Berberis
 Berberis incerta: shrub

Betulaceae

Alnus
 Alnus acuminata arguta: tree – 
 Alnus jorullensis: tree – pine-oak forest, pine forest – 
 Alnus jorullensis lutea: tree –

Carpinus
 Carpinus tropicalis: cloud forest, pine-oak forest –

Ostrya
 Ostrya virginiana: cloud forest – ,

Bignoniaceae

Amphilophium
 Amphilophium paniculatum: vine
 Amphilophium paniculatum paniculatum: vine

Astianthus

Crescentia
 Crescentia alata: shrub tree –

Distictis
 Distictis buccinatoria: shrub tree –

Melloa
 Melloa quadrivalvis: shrub tree – ,

Pithecoctenium
 Pithecoctenium crucigerum: shrub tree

Tabebuia
 Tabebuia chrysantha: shrub – 
 Tabebuia rosea: shrub –

Tecoma
 Tecoma stans: shrub – ,

Bixaceae

Bixa
 Bixa orellana: shrub or tree –

Bombacaceae

Bernoullia
 Bernoullia flammea

Ceiba
 Ceiba acuminata: tree
 Ceiba aesculifolia: tree – 
 Ceiba pentandra: tree – ,

Pseudobombax
 Pseudobombax ellipticum – 
 Pseudobombax palmeri: tree

Boraginaceae

Bourreria
 Bourreria superba

Cordia
 Cordia alliodora: tree – 
 Cordia cordiformis: tree
 Cordia diversifolia: tree – 
 Cordia eleagnoides: tree – 
 Cordia inermis: tree 
 Cordia morelosana: tree 
 Cordia prunifolia: tree – 
 Cordia salvadorensis: tree 

Ehretia
 Ehretia latifolia: tree

Heliotropium
 Heliotropium fallax: herb
 Heliotropium indicum: annual herb – , 
 Heliotropium procumbens: herb
 Heliotropium rufipilum: herb –

Macromeria
 Macromeria exserta: herb
 Macromeria longiflora: herb

Tournefortia
 Tournefortia acutiflora: herb
 Tournefortia hirsutissima: herb
 Tournefortia mutabilis: herb
 Tournefortia petiolaris: herb
 Tournefortia volubilis: herb
 Tournefortia petiolaris: herb
 Tournefortia petiolaris: herb

Buddlejaceae

Buddleja
 Buddleja cordata: shrub – butterfly bush, 
 Buddleja parviflora: shrub – 
 Buddleja sessiliflora: shrub –

Burseraceae

Bursera
 Bursera bipinata: tree
 Bursera bipinata × Bursera copalifera: tree
 Bursera copalifera: tree
 Bursera diversifolia: tree 
 Bursera fagaroides: tree – , 
 Bursera grandifolia: tree – 
 Bursera graveolens: tree – 
 Bursera heteresthes: tree
 Bursera kerberi: tree
 Bursera multijuga: tree
 Bursera penicillata: tree
 Bursera rhoifolia: tree
 Bursera schlechtendalii: tree
 Bursera simaruba: tree – 
 Bursera sp. nov.

Commiphora
 Commiphora sarcopoda: tree

Terebinthus
 Terebinthus acuminata: tree

Cactaceae

Acanthocereus
 Acanthocereus occidentalis: vine cactus

Cephalocereus
 Cephalocereus alensis: barrel cactus –

Epiphyllum
 Epiphyllum anguliger: vine cactus –

Ferocactus
 Ferocactus reppenhagenii: barrel cactus –

Heliocereus
 Heliocereus speciosus: vine cactus –

Hylocereus
 Hylocereus ocamponis: vine cactus – 
 Hylocereus purpusii: vine cactus

Mammillaria
 Mammillaria beneckei: barrel cactus
 Mammillaria reppenhagenii: barrel cactus – 
 Mammillaria scrippsiana: barrel cactus
 Mammillaria supraflumen: barrel cactus

Neobuxbaumia
 Neobuxbaumia mezcalensis

Nopalea
 Nopalea karwinskiana: nopal cactus – prickly pear,

Opuntia
 Opuntia atropes: nopal cactus
 Opuntia fuliginosa: nopal cactus – , 
 Opuntia puberula: nopal cactus –

Pachycereus

Peniocereus
 Peniocereus cuixmalensis: vine cactus

Pereskiopsis
 Pereskiopsis aquosa: cactus bush
 Pereskiopsis diguetii: cactus bush – ,

Rhipsalis
 Rhipsalis baccifera: cactus herb

Selenicereus
 Selenicereus atropilosus: vine cactus
 Selenicereus vagans: vine cactus

Stenocereus

Callitrichaceae

Callitriche
 Callitriche heterophylla: aquatic herb

Campanulaceae or Lobeliaceae

Diastatea
 Diastatea micrantha

Heterotoma
 Heterotoma lobelioides var. glabra: annual herb

Lobelia
 Lobelia cordifolia: annual herb
 Lobelia fenestralis: annual herb
 Lobelia jaliscensis: annual herb – 
 Lobelia laxiflora: annual herb
 Lobelia longicaulis: annual herb
 Lobelia occidentalis: annual herb

Capparaceae

Capparis
 Capparis mollicella: shrub – caper, 
 Capparis quiriguensis: shrub

Cleome
 Cleome pilosa: annual herb
 Cleome speciosa: annual herb – 
 Cleome tenuis: annual herb – 
 Cleome viscosa: annual herb

Crateva
 Crateva palmeri: tree – ,

Morisonia

Capparaceae or Resedaceae

Forchhammeria
 Forchhammeria pallida
 Forchhammeria sessifolia

Caprifoliaceae

Lonicera
 Lonicera acutifolia: shrub – honeysuckle

Symphoricarpos
 Symphoricarpos microphyllus: shrub

Caprifoliaceae or Adoxaceae

Viburnum
 Viburnum hartwegii: shrub
 Viburnum microcarpum: shrub

Caricaceae

Carica
 Carica papaya: tree – papaya

Jacaratia
 Jacaratia mexicana: tree –

Jarilla
 Jarilla chocola: tree

Caryophyllaceae

Arenaria
 Arenaria lanuginosa: herb – sandwort
 Arenaria megalantha: herb – sandwort

Cerastium
 Cerastium nutans: herb – chickweed
 Cerastium sinaloense: herb – chickweed

Drymaria
 Drymaria cordata: herb
 Drymaria excisa: herb
 Drymaria gracilis: herb
 Drymaria minuscula: herb
 Drymaria villosa: herb

Stellaria
 Stellaria spp.: herbs - starwort, stitchwort; (formerly the now-obsolete genus Alsine)
 Stellaria cuspidata: herb – chickweed

Celastraceae

Celastrus
 Celastrus pringlei: shrub – ,

Perrottetia
 Perrottetia longistylis: bush

Rhacoma
 Rhacoma eucymosa: tree
 Rhacoma managuatillo

Schaefferia
 Schaefferia frutescens: shrub
 Schaefferia pilosa: shrub

Wimmeria
 Wimmeria lanceolata: shrub –

Zinowiewia
 Zinowiewia concinna: shrub – cloud forest –

Chenopodiaceae

Chenopodium
 Chenopodium ambrosioides: annual herb – 
 Chenopodium graveolens: annual herb –

Chloranthaceae

Hedyosmum
 Hedyosmum mexicanum: tree – cloud forest –

Chrysobalanaceae

Couepia
 Couepia polyandra: shrub –

Licania
 Licania retifolia: shrub

Clethraceae

Clethra
 Clethra fragans: bush (not in Vazquez)
 Clethra rosei: bush – , 
 Clethra vicentina: bush – cloud forest, pine-oak forest – 
 Clethra sp.: bush

Cochlospermaceae or Bixaceae

Cochlospermum
 Cochlospermum vitifolium: tree –

Combretaceae

Combretum
 Combretum fruticosum: vine or  – ,

Compositae or Asteraceae

Acmella
 Acmella alba: herb – toothache plant
 Acmella oppositifolia: herb – toothache plant

Ageratum
 Ageratum corymbosum: annual herb
 Ageratum corymbosum: annual herb
 Ageratum corymbosum fo. albiflorum: annual herb
 Ageratum houstonianum: annual herb

Alloispermum
 Alloispermum colimense: annual herb
 Alloispermum integrifolium: annual herb
 Alloispermum palmeri var. palmeri: annual herb
 Alloispermum scabrum var. scabrum: annual herb

Archibaccharis
 Archibaccharis asperifolia: shrub
 Archibaccharis hieracioides var. glandulosa: shrub
 Archibaccharis schiedeana: shrub
 Archibaccharis serratifolia: shrub

Aster or Symphyotrichum
 Aster moranensis: herb – 
 Aster subulatus: herb

Baccharis
 Baccharis heterophylla: shrub – 
 Baccharis multiflora: shrub
 Baccharis occidentalis: shrub
 Baccharis salicifolia: shrub – mule fat
 Baccharis trinervis: shrub –

Baltimora
 Baltimora geminata: herb

Bidens
 Bidens acrifolia: herb
 Bidens aequisquama var. aequisquama: herb
 Bidens odorata var. odorata: herb
 Bidens odorata var. rosea: herb
 Bidens ostruthioides: herb
 Bidens pilosa: herb – beggarticks, 
 Bidens reptans var. urbanii: herb
 Bidens riparia var. refracta: herb
 Bidens rostrata: herb
 Bidens squarrosa: herb
 Bidens triplinervia: herb

Brickellia
 Brickellia adenolepis: herb
 Brickellia cardiophylla: herb
 Brickellia diffusa: herb
 Brickellia filipes: herb
 Brickellia jaliscensis: herb
 Brickellia magnifica: shrub:
 Brickellia scoparia: herb or shrub
 Brickellia secundiflora var. monticola: herb or shrub
 Brickellia squarrosa: herb or shrub
 Brickellia subuligera: shrub

Calea

Carminatia
 Carminatia recondita: herb
 Carminatia tenuiflora: herb

Chaptalia
 Chaptalia leucocephala: herb

Chrysanthemum
 Chrysanthemum indicum var. mexicanum: herb

Cirsium
 Cirsium anartiolepis: perennial root herb – thistle, 
 Cirsium ehrenbergii: perennial root herb
 Cirsium mexicanum: perennial root herb
 Cirsium tolucanum: perennial root
 Cirsium sp. nov.: perennial root –

Clibadium
 Clibadium arboreum: herb

Conyza
 Conyza apurensis: herb
 Conyza bonariensis: herb – , ?
 Conyza canadensis: herb
 Conyza confusa: herb
 Conyza coronopifolia: herb
 Conyza coulteri: herb
 Conyza microcephala: herb
 Conyza sophiifolia: herb

Coreopsis
 Coreopsis petrophiloides: herb

Cosmos
 Cosmos bipinnatus: herb – 
 Cosmos carvifolius: herb
 Cosmos intercedens: herb
 Cosmos sulphureus: herb

Cymophora
 Cymophora hintonii: herb

Dahlia
 Dahlia coccinea: herb – 
 Dahlia tenuicaulis: perennial bulb herb –

Decachaeta
 Decachaeta haenkeana: bush

Delilia
 Delilia biflora: herb

Desmanthodium
 Desmanthodium fruticosum: shrub

Dyssodia
 Dyssodia neomexicana var. pulcherrima: herb
 Dyssodia porophyllum var. cancellata: shrub
 Dyssodia squamosa: shrub
 Dyssodia tagetiflora: shrub

Eclipta
 Eclipta prostrata: herb

Elephantopus
 Elephantopus mollis: herb

Erechtites
 Erechtites hieraciifolius: herb

Erigeron
 Erigeron longipes: herb
 Erigeron ortegae var. ortigae: herb
 Erigeron polycephalus: herb
 Erigeron velutipes: herb – ,

Eupatorium
 Eupatorium araliifolium: shrub
 Eupatorium areolare: shrub
 Eupatorium arsenei: shrub
 Eupatorium atrocordatum: shrub
 Eupatorium ceriferum: shrub
 Eupatorium chiapense: shrub
 Eupatorium choricephalum: shrub
 Eupatorium ciliatum: shrub
 Eupatorium collinum: shrub – 
 Eupatorium conspicuum: shrub
 Eupatorium cronquistii: shrub
 Eupatorium cylindricum: shrub
 Eupatorium dolichobasis: shrub
 Eupatorium glaberrimum: shrub
 Eupatorium hebebotryum: shrub
 Eupatorium isolepis: shrub
 Eupatorium lasioneuron: shrub
 Eupatorium leptodictyon: shrub
 Eupatorium mairetianum: shrub
 Eupatorium malacolepis: shrub
 Eupatorium monanthum: shrub
 Eupatorium morifolium: shrub
 Eupatorium muelleri: shrub
 Eupatorium nelsonii: shrub
 Eupatorium odoratum: herb – 
 Eupatorium oerstedianum: shrub
 Eupatorium oresbium: shrub
 Eupatorium ovaliflorum: shrub
 Eupatorium pauperculum: shrub
 Eupatorium pazcuarense: shrub
 Eupatorium pichinchense: shrub
 Eupatorium polybotryum: shrub
 Eupatorium quadrangulare: shrub
 Eupatorium ramireziorum: shrub
 Eupatorium rhomboideum: shrub
 Eupatorium scabrellum: shrub
 Eupatorium sinaloense: shrub
 Eupatorium sonorae: shrub
 Eupatorium vitifolium: shrub

Eupatorium or Ageratina
 Eupatorium barriei: shrub
 Eupatorium manantlanum: shrub

Fleischmannia
 Fleischmannia arguta: herb –

Florestina
 Florestina pedata: herb

Galeana
 Galeana pratensis: herb

Galinsoga
 Galinsoga quadriradiata: herb –

Gnaphalium
 Gnaphalium americanum: herb
 Gnaphalium attenuatum var. attenuatum: herb
 Gnaphalium attenuatum var. sylvicola: herb
 Gnaphalium bourgovii: herb – 
 Gnaphalium canescens: herb
 Gnaphalium chartaceum: herb
 Gnaphalium jaliscense: herb
 Gnaphalium liebmannii var. monticola: herb
 Gnaphalium roseum: herb
 Gnaphalium semilanatum: herb
 Gnaphalium sphacelatum: herb
 Gnaphalium viscosum: herb
 Gnaphalium sp.: herb

Guardiola
 Guardiola mexicana
 Guardiola tulocarpus

Helenium
 Helenium scorzonerifolium

Heliopsis
 Heliopsis bupthalmoides
 Heliopsis procumbens

Heterosperma
 Heterosperma pinnatum

Heterotheca
 Hieracium abscissum
 Hieracium fendleri
 Hieracium fendleri subsp. ostreophyllum

Hofmeisteria
 Hofmeisteria dissecta
 Hofmeisteria urenifolia

Isocarpha
 Isocarpha oppositifolia

Jaegeria
 Jaegeria hirta
 Jaegeria macrocephala

Lagascea
 Lagascea decipiens
 Lagascea helianthifolia

Lasianthaea
 Lasianthaea ceanothifolia
 Lasianthaea fruticosa
 Lasianthaea fruticosa var. michoacana
 Lasianthaea helianthoides var. helianthoides
 Lasianthaea macrocephala
 Lasianthaea palmeri

Liabum
 Liabum broomeae or Sinclairia broomeae
 Liabum cervinum
 Liabum glabrum var. hypoleucum
 Liabum liebmannii
 Liabum sp. nov.

Melampodium
 Melampodium americanum
 Melampodium divaricatum
 Melampodium microcephalum
 Melampodium nutans
 Melampodium perfoliatum
 Melampodium tepicense

Mikania
 Mikania cordifolia

Milleria
 Milleria quinqueflora

Montanoa
 Montanoa andersonii
 Montanoa bipinnatifida
 Montanoa grandiflora
 Montanoa karvinskii
 Montanoa leucantha

Odontotrichum
 Odontotrichum multilobum
 Odontotrichum palmeri

Onoseris
 Onoseris onoseroides

Osbertia
 Osbertia stolonifera

Otopappus
 Otopappus acuminatus
 Otopappus epaleaceus
 Otopappus microcephalus
 Otopappus tequilanus
 Otopappus scaber

Parthenium
 Parthenium hysterophorus

Pectis
 Pectis linifolia
 Pectis repens

Perezia
 Perezia dugesii
 Perezia fruticosa
 Perezia glomeriflora
 Perezia hooveri
 Perezia patens
 Perezia simulata

Pericalia
 Pericalia sessilifolia

Perymenium
 Perymenium alticola
 Perymenium buphthalmoides
 Perymenium jaliscense
 Perymenium mendezii
 Perymenium uxoris
 Perymenium wilburorum

Pinaropappus
 Pinaropappus diguetii
 Pinaropappus roseus

Piqueria
 Piqueria triflora

Pittocaulon
 Pittocaulon hintonii

Pluchea
 Pluchea salicifolia
 Pluchea symphytifolia

Podachaenium
 Podachaenium eminens

Polymnia
 Polymnia maculata
 Polymnia macvaughii
 Polymnia uvedalia

Porophyllum
 Porophyllum coloratum
 Porophyllum lindenii
 Porophyllum pringlei
 Porophyllum punctatum
 Porophyllum ruderale
 Porophyllum viridiflorum

Psacalium
 Psacalium goldsmithii
 Psacalium peltigerum
 Psacalium pentaflorum
 Psacalium poculiferum

Pseudelephantopus
 Pseudelephantopus spicatus

Rumfordia
 Rumfordia floribunda
 Rumfordia floribunda var. floribunda
 Rumfordia floribunda var. jaliscensis

Schkuhria
 Schkuhria pinnata

Sclerocarpus
 Sclerocarpus divaricatus

Senecio
 Senecio albonervius
 Senecio angulifolius
 Senecio argutus
 Senecio barba-johannis
 Senecio bellidifolius
 Senecio callosus
 Senecio chapalensis
 Senecio cinerarioides
 Senecio galicianus var. galicianus
 Senecio galicianus var. manantlanensis
 Senecio hartwegii
 Senecio multidentatus
 Senecio roldana
 Senecio salignus
 Senecio sanguisorbae
 Senecio sinuatus
 Senecio standleyi
 Senecio stoechadiformis
 Senecio suffultus

Sigesbeckia
 Sigesbeckia agrestis

Simsia
 Simsia annectens

Sonchus
 Sonchus oleraceus –

Stevia
 Stevia alatipes
 Stevia caracasana
 Stevia lasioclada
 Stevia latifolia
 Stevia lucida
 Stevia micradenia
 Stevia monardifolia
 Stevia myricoides
 Stevia nelsonii
 Stevia origanoides
 Stevia ovata
 Stevia serrata var. serrata
 Stevia subpubescens
 Stevia trifida
 Stevia viscida

Tagetes
 Tagetes filifolia – 
 Tagetes lucida – 
 Tagetes lunulata
 Tagetes remotiflora – , 
 Tagetes stenophylla
 Tagetes subulata

Taraxacum
 Taraxacum officinale –

Tithonia
 Tithonia rotundifolia – 

Tridax
 Tridax accedens
 Tridax accedens
 Tridax procumbens

Trigonospermum
 Trigonospermum melampodioides –

Tagetes
 Trixis mexicana var. mexicana
 Trixis michuacana var. longifolia

Verbesina
 Verbesina cinerascens
 Verbesina crocata
 Verbesina culminicola
 Verbesina fastigiata
 Verbesina greenmanii
 Verbesina oligantha
 Verbesina oncophora
 Verbesina oxylepis
 Verbesina parviflora
 Verbesina sphaerocephala
 Verbesina tetraptera
 Verbesina turbacensis
 Verbesina heterocarpa

Vernonia
 Vernonia baadii
 Vernonia bealliae
 Vernonia capreifolia
 Vernonia cordata
 Vernonia coulteri
 Vernonia patens
 Vernonia pungens
 Vernonia serratuloides
 Vernonia triflosculosa
 Vernonia vernonioides

Tagetes
 Taraxacum officinale

Viguiera
 Viguiera cordata
 Viguiera cordata var. cordata
 Viguiera dentata
 Viguiera ensifolia
 Viguiera grahamii
 Viguiera hypochlora
 Viguiera latibracteata
 Viguiera pachycephala
 Viguiera pringlei
 Viguiera tenuis

Zinnia
 Zinnia americana
 Zinnia bicolor
 Zinnia peruviana
 Zinnia zinnioides

Connaraceae

Rourea
 Rourea glabra

Convolvulaceae

Evolvulus
 Evolvulus alsinoides
 Evolvulus nummularius

Ipomoea
 Ipomoea alba
 Ipomoea ampullacea
 Ipomoea arborescens
 Ipomoea batatoides
 Ipomoea bracteata
 Ipomoea capillacea
 Ipomoea cardiophylla
 Ipomoea cholulensis
 Ipomoea corymbosa
 Ipomoea cuernavacensis
 Ipomoea decemcornuta
 Ipomoea dimorphophylla
 Ipomoea dumosa
 Ipomoea funis
 Ipomoea hartwegii
 Ipomoea hederifolia
 Ipomoea invicta
 Ipomoea lindenii
 Ipomoea mairetii
 Ipomoea minutiflora
 Ipomoea murucoides
 Ipomoea neei
 Ipomoea nil – 
 Ipomoea noctulifolia
 Ipomoea orizabensis
 Ipomoea pseudoracemosa
 Ipomoea santillanii
 Ipomoea seducta
 Ipomoea spectata
 Ipomoea trifida
 Ipomoea sp. nov.

Coriariaceae

Coriaria
 Coriaria ruscifolia subsp. microphylla

Cornaceae

Cornus
 Cornus disciflora: cloud forest, pine-oak forest, gallery forest – 
 Cornus excelsa –

Crassulaceae

Bryophyllum
 Bryophyllum pinnatum –

Graptopetalum
 Graptopetalum fruticosum

Curatella
 Sedum grandipetalum
 Sedum greggii
 Sedum jaliscanum
 Sedum tortuosum
 Sedum sp. 1
 Sedum sp. 2

Cruciferae or Brassicaceae

Brassica
 Brassica rapa –

Cardamine
 Cardamine fulcrata

Lepidium
 Lepidium lasiocarpum
 Lepidium oblongum
 Lepidium virginicum

Raphanus
 Raphanus raphanistrum –

Rorippa
 Rorippa nasturtium-aquaticum –

Cucurbitaceae

Cayaponia
 Cayaponia attenuata – 
 Cayaponia racemosa –

Cremastopus
 Cremastopus rostratus

Cucumis
 Cucumis anguria –

Cucurbita
 Cucurbita argyrosperma – , 
 Cucurbita ficifolia –

Cyclanthera
 Cyclanthera dissecta
 Cyclanthera langaei
 Cyclanthera steyermarkii
 Cyclanthera tamnoides

Echinopepon
 Echinopepon jaliscanus
 Echinopepon lanatus
 Echinopepon pringlei
 Echinopepon racemosus

Ibervillea
 Ibervillea maxima –

Melothria
 Melothria pendula
 Melothria pringlei

Momordica
 Momordica charantia –

Polyclathra
 Polyclathra cucumerina

Rytidostylis
 Rytidostylis gracilis
 Rytidostylis longisepala

Schizocarpum
 Schizocarpum longisepalum
 Schizocarpum palmeri

Sechium
 Sechium compositum

Sicyos
 Sicyos laciniatus
 Sicyos longisepalus

Cuscutaceae

Cuscuta
 Cuscuta corymbosa – 
 Cuscuta mitriformis or Cuscuta mitraeformis – ,

Dichapetalaceae

Tapura
 Tapura mexicana

Dilleniaceae

Curatella
 Curatella americana –

Davilla
 Davilla kunthii

Dipentodontaceae

Perrottetia
 Perrottetia longistylis: cloud forest

Ebenaceae

Diospyros
 Diospyros sinaloensis
 Diospyros sp.

Elaeocarpaceae

Muntingia
 Muntingia calabura –

Sloanea
 Sloanea terniflora – ,

Ericaceae

Arbutus
 Arbutus occidentalis – 
 Arbutus xalapensis –

Comarostaphylis
 Comarostaphylis discolor – , 
 Comarostaphylis discolor subsp. manantlanensis – 
 Comarostaphylis glaucescens

Gaultheria
 Gaultheria hirtiflora

Vaccinium
 Vaccinium confertum
 Vaccinium stenophyllum – cloud forest, pine-oak forest, pine forest –

Euphorbiaceae

Acalypha
 Acalypha alopecuroides
 Acalypha cincta
 Acalypha filipes
 Acalypha grisea
 Acalypha hypogaea
 Acalypha langiana
 Acalypha microphylla
 Acalypha ocymoides
 Acalypha ostryifolia
 Acalypha salvadorensis
 Acalypha schiedeana
 Acalypha setosa
 Acalypha subviscida
 Acalypha triloba
 Acalypha umbrosa
 Acalypha vagans
 Acalypha sp.

Adelia
 Adelia barbinervis

Argythamnia
 Argythamnia manzanilloana

Astrocasia
 Astrocasia tremula

Bernardia
 Bernardia gentryana
 Bernardia mexicana
 Bernardia santanae

Bernardia
 Chamaesyce berteroana or Chamaesyce berteriana
 Chamaesyce grisea
 Chamaesyce hirta
 Chamaesyce hirta var. procumbens
 Chamaesyce hypericifolia
 Chamaesyce hyssopifolia
 Chamaesyce indivisa

Chiropetalum
 Chiropetalum schiedeanum

Cnidoscolus
 Cnidoscolus autlanensis – 
 Cnidoscolus spinosus
 Cnidoscolus tepiquensis

Croton
 Croton billbergianus
 Croton ciliato-glandulifera – 
 Croton draco – 
 Croton flavescens
 Croton fragilis
 Croton fragilis
 Croton hirtus
 Croton pyramidalis
 Croton septemnervius
 Croton suberosus
 Croton wilburii
 Croton ynesiae

Dalechampia
 Dalechampia scandens

Dalembertia
 Dalembertia populifolia

Euphorbia
 Euphorbia ariensis
 Euphorbia calyculata
 Euphorbia colletioides
 Euphorbia cotinifolia
 Euphorbia cyathophora
 Euphorbia dentata
 Euphorbia dioscoreoides
 Euphorbia furcillata
 Euphorbia graminea
 Euphorbia graminea var. novogaliciana
 Euphorbia heterophylla
 Euphorbia humayensis
 Euphorbia jaliscensis
 Euphorbia macropus
 Euphorbia macvaughii
 Euphorbia multiseta
 Euphorbia ocymoides
 Euphorbia peganoides
 Euphorbia pulcherrima
 Euphorbia schlechtendalii var. pacifica 
 Euphorbia sphaerorhiza
 Euphorbia strigosa
 Euphorbia tanquahuete
 Euphorbia xalapensis

Gymnanthes
 Gymnanthes actinostemoides

Hura
 Hura polyandra –

Jatropha
 Jatropha bartlettii
 Jatropha cordata
 Jatropha mcvaughii
 Jatropha platyphylla

Mabea
 Mabea occidentalis

Manihot
 Manihot aesculifolia
 Manihot intermedia
 Manihot michaelis
 Manihot rhomboidea
 Manihot rhomboidea subsp. microcarpa

Margaritaria

Pedilanthus
 Pedilanthus calcaratus – 
 Pedilanthus diazlunanus – 
 Pedilanthus palmeri –

Phyllanthus
 Phyllanthus glaucescens
 Phyllanthus gypsicola
 Phyllanthus mocinianus
 Phyllanthus niruri
 Phyllanthus standleyi
 Phyllanthus stipulatus
 Phyllanthus tequilensis

Ricinus
 Ricinus communis –

Sapium
 Sapium pedicellatum

Sebastiania
 Sebastiania corniculata
 Sebastiania hintonii

Tragia
 Tragia affinis
 Tragia pacifica
 Tragia volubilis

Sebastiania
 Sebastiania hintonii: cloud forest

Fagaceae

Quercus
 Quercus aristata
 Quercus calophylla (incorrectly called Quercus candicans): cloud forest
 Quercus castanea: pine-oak forest, pine forest

 Quercus crassifolia
 Quercus crassipes
 Quercus deserticola
 Quercus elliptica
 Quercus excelsa
 Quercus confertifolia (as Quercus gentryi)
 Quercus glaucescens
 Quercus insignis
 Quercus laeta
 Quercus laurina: pine-oak forest, pine forest, pine-fir forest – Encino laurelillo, Encino asta
 Quercus magnoliifolia: pine-oak forest, pine forest
 Quercus martinezii
 Quercus obtusata
 Quercus peduncularis
 Quercus planipocula
 Quercus prainiana, synonym of Quercus coffeicolor
 Quercus resinosa
 Quercus rugosa – 
 Quercus resinosa
 Quercus salicifolia: cloud forest
 Quercus scitophylla
 Quercus sororia
 Quercus splendens, synonym of Quercus peduncularis
 Quercus uxoris
 Quercus xalapensis
 Quercus sp. nov 1
 Quercus sp. nov 2
 Quercus sp. nov 3

Flacourtiaceae

Fouquieria
 Casearia arguta
 Casearia corymbosa
 Casearia sylvestris

Hasseltiopsis
 Hasseltiopsis dioica

Neopringlea
 Neopringlea viscosa

Prockia
 Prockia crucis

Xylosma
 Xylosma flexuosa
 Xylosma velutina

Fouquieriaceae

Fouquieria
 Fouquieria formosa

Garryaceae

Garrya
 Garrya laurifolia: cloud forest

Gentianaceae

Centaurium
 Centaurium martinii
 Centaurium nudicaule
 Centaurium setaceum
 Centaurium tenuifolium

Gentiana
 Gentiana caliculata
 Gentiana spathacea

Halenia
 Halenia brevicornis
 Halenia crumiana

Geraniaceae

Erodium
 Erodium cicutarium

Geranium
 Geranium hernandesii
 Geranium lilacinum
 Geranium seemannii
 Geranium sp.

Gesneriaceae

Achimenes
 Achimenes antirrhina
 Achimenes flava
 Achimenes grandiflora
 Achimenes heterophylla
 Achimenes longiflora

Drymonia
 Drymonia serrulata

Episcia
 Episcia punctata

Moussonia
 Moussonia elegans

Phinaea
 Phinaea multiflora

Guttiferae or Calophyllaceae

Calophyllum
 Calophyllum brasiliense: tree –

Guttiferae or Clusiaceae

Clusia
 Clusia salvini: cloud forest

Guttiferae or Hypericaceae

Clusia
 Hypericum paucifolium
 Hypericum philonotis

Rheedia
 Rheedia edulis

Hamamelidaceae

Matudaea
 Matudaea trinervia: cloud forest – ,

Hernandiaceae

Gyrocarpus
 Gyrocarpus jatrophifolius – ,

Hippocrateaceae or Celastraceae

Hippocratea
 Hippocratea celastroides
 Hippocratea volubilis –

Hydrophyllaceae

Hydrolea
 Hydrolea spinosa – ,

Phacelia
 Phacelia platycarpa – ,

Wigandia
 Wigandia urens – ,

Icacinaceae

Calatola
 Calatola laevigata –

Juglandaceae

Juglans
 Juglans major: cloud forest – black walnut,

Julianaceae

Asterohyptis
 Amphipterygium adstringens – ,

Labiatae or Lamiaceae

Asterohyptis
 Asterohyptis stellulata

Cunila
 Cunila longiflora
 Cunila lythrifolia
 Cunila pycnantha

Hyptis
 Hyptis albida
 Hyptis capitata
 Hyptis mutabilis
 Hyptis oblongifolia
 Hyptis pectinata
 Hyptis rhytidea
 Hyptis suaveolens
 Hyptis urticoides

Leonotis
 Leonotis nepetifolia –

Lepechinia
 Lepechinia caulescens – 
 Lepechinia nelsonii

Leonotis
 Leonotis nepetifolia

Marrubium
 Marrubium vulgare –

Mentha
 Mentha sp.

Ocimum
 Ocimum micranthum –

Salvia
 Salvia albocaerulea
 Salvia arthrocoma
 Salvia brachyodonta
 Salvia breviflora
 Salvia bruebenzii (not listed in Tropicos)
 Salvia carnea
 Salvia cinnabarina
 Salvia concolor
 Salvia cuevasiana or Scutellaria cuevasiana
 Salvia elegans – 
 Salvia firma
 Salvia gesneriiflora
 Salvia hispanica
 Salvia iodantha
 Salvia lasiantha
 Salvia lasiocephala
 Salvia lavanduloides
 Salvia leucantha
 Salvia longispicata
 Salvia longistyla
 Salvia manantlanensis
 Salvia mcvaughii
 Salvia meera
 Salvia mexicana
 Salvia platyphylla
 Salvia polystachya
 Salvia purpurea
 Salvia ramamoorthyana
 Salvia riparia
 Salvia rostellata
 Salvia santanae
 Salvia sapinea
 Salvia sessei
 Salvia thyrsiflora
 Salvia uruapana
 Salvia vazquezii
 Salvia viscidifolia

Satureja
 Satureja jaliscana
 Satureja macrostema var. laevigata

Scutellaria
 Scutellaria caerulea
 Scutellaria purpurascens

Stachys
 Stachys agraria
 Stachys coccinea
 Stachys grahamii
 Stachys manantlanensis
 Stachys pacifica

Lauraceae

Beilschmiedia
 Beilschmiedia pendula

Cinnamomum
 Cinnamomum pachypodum: cloud forest – laurel

Licaria

Litsea
 Litsea glaucescens –

Nectandra
 Nectandra glabrescens – ,

Persea
 Persea hintonii – 
 Persea sp.

Leguminosae or Mimosaceae, Caesalpiniaceae, Fabaceae

Acacia
 Acacia acatlensis
 Acacia angustissima var. angustissima – 
 Acacia angustissima var. texensis
 Acacia farnesiana or Vachellia farnesiana: secondary vegetation – 
 Acacia glomerosa
 Acacia hindsii – 
 Acacia macilenta – , 
 Acacia pennatula – 
 Acacia riparia – 
 Acacia × standleyi
 Acacia tequilana

Aeschynomene
 Aeschynomene americana var. glandulosa
 Aeschynomene amorphoides
 Aeschynomene histrix var. histrix
 Aeschynomene langlassei
 Aeschynomene petraea
 Aeschynomene rudis
 Aeschynomene villosa var. mexicana
 Aeschynomene villosa var. villosa

Albizia
 Albizia occidentalis
 Apoplanesia paniculataAstragalus
 Astragalus ervoides var. maysillesii 
 Astragalus guatemalensis var. brevidentatusBauhinia
 Bauhinia divaricata –  Bauhinia pauletia –  Bauhinia ungulataBrogniartia
 Brogniartia mortoniiCaesalpinia
 Caesalpinia cacalaco –  Caesalpinia mexicana Caesalpinia pulcherrima – Calliandra
 Calliandra anomala Calliandra bijuga Calliandra caeciliae Calliandra eriophylla Calliandra grandiflora Calliandra hirsuta Calliandra houstonii –  Calliandra laevis: gallery forest – ,  Calliandra longipedicellata: secondary vegetation

Calopogonium
 Calopogonium caeruleum Calopogonium mucunoidesCanavalia
 Canavalia acuminata Canavalia hirsutissima Canavalia septentrionalis Canavalia villosaCercidium
 Centrosema plumieri Centrosema pubescens –  Centrosema sagittatum Centrosema virginianumCercidium or Parkinsonia
 Cercidium praecox or Parkinsonia praecox – Chamaecrista
 Chamaecrista absus var. meionandra Chamaecrista glandulosa var. flavicoma Chamaecrista nictitans var. jaliscensis Chamaecrista nictitans var. pilosa Chamaecrista punctulata –  Chamaecrista rotundifolia var. rotundifolia Chamaecrista serpens var. wrightiiClitoria
 Clitoria mexicana Clitoria polystachyaCologania
 Cologania biloba Cologania broussonetii Cologania procumbensConzattia
 Conzattia multifloraCoursetia
 Coursetia caribaea Coursetia glandulosa Coursetia mollis Coursetia pumila – Crotalaria
 Dalea cliffortiana Dalea elata Dalea foliolosa Dalea leucostachya Dalea obreniformis Dalea pulchella Dalea roseiflora Dalea sericea Dalea versicolorDesmodium
 Desmodium affine Desmodium ambiguum Desmodium angustifolium Desmodium aparines Desmodium barbatum Desmodium bellum Desmodium cinereum Desmodium cordistipulum Desmodium distortum Desmodium ghiesbreghtii Desmodium glabrum Desmodium guadalajaranum Desmodium hartwegianum Desmodium infractum Desmodium jaliscanum Desmodium macrostachyum Desmodium molliculum Desmodium nicaraguense Desmodium novogalicianum Desmodium occidentale Desmodium orbiculare var. rubricaule Desmodium plicatum Desmodium prehensile Desmodium procumbens Desmodium procumbens var. transversum Desmodium pseudoamplifolium Desmodium sericophyllum Desmodium skinneri Desmodium strobilaceum Desmodium sumichrastii Desmodium tortuosum Desmodium urarioides Desmodium volubileDiphysa
 Diphysa floribunda Diphysa puberulenta Diphysa suberosaEntada
 Entada patens Entada polystachyaEnterolobium
 Enterolobium cyclocarpum – , huanacasteEriosema
 Eriosema diffusum Eriosema longicalyx Eriosema multiflorum Eriosema pulchellumErythrina
 Erythrina breviflora Erythrina lanata subsp. occidentalisEysenhardtia
 Eysenhardtia platycarpa Eysenhardtia polystachyaGalactia
 Galactia incana Galactia sp.

Haematoxylum
 Haematoxylum brasiletto – palo brasilIndigofera
 Indigofera densiflora Indigofera jaliscensis Indigofera palmeri Indigofera thibaudianaInga
 Inga eriocarpa – cuil, guaginiguil, juaniquil peludo Inga hintonii – jacanicuil cimarron Inga laurina – cuaniquil, guajillo, jinicuil Inga veraLeucaena
 Leucaena esculenta – huajillo, guaje Leucaena macrophylla – guajeLonchocarpus
 Lonchocarpus hintonii Lonchocarpus lanceolatus Lonchocarpus salvadorensisLotus
 Lotus oroboides Lotus repensLupinus
 Lupinus elegans – cantues Lupinus exaltatus – cantues Lupinus madrensis – cantues Lupinus stipulatusLysiloma
 Lysiloma acapulcense – tepeguaje Lysiloma microphyllum – tepemezquite consteno Lysiloma tergeminum – pelo de angelLysiloma
 Lysiloma acapulcensis Lysiloma microphyllumMachaerium
 Machaerium kegelii Machaerium salvadorense – garabatom, guamuchil del diabililloMacroptilium
 Macroptilium atropurpureum Macroptilium sp.

Marina
 Marina crenulata Marina diffusa var. diffusa Marina grammadenia Marina neglecta var. neglecta – escobilla Marina nutans Marina scopaMimosa
 Mimosa acantholoba Mimosa affinis Mimosa albida Mimosa benthamii Mimosa galeottii Mimosa guatemalensis Mimosa invisa Mimosa pigra var. berlandieri Mimosa pudica Mimosa rosei Mimosa sp.

Nissolia
 Nissolia fruticosa Nissolia laxior Nissolia leiogyne Nissolia micropteraPachecoa
 Pachecoa prismaticaPachyrhizus
 Pachyrhizus erosus var. erosusParkinsonia
 Parkinsonia aculeataPhaseolus
 Phaseolus coccineus subsp. coccineus Phaseolus coccineus subsp. formosus Phaseolus leptostachyus Phaseolus lunatus var. lunatus Phaseolus leptostachyus var. silvester Phaseolus micranthus Phaseolus pauciflorus Phaseolus perplexus Phaseolus vulgaris Phaseolus sp. 1
 Phaseolus sp. 2

Piscidia
 Piscidia carthagenensisPachecoa
 Pachecoa prismaticaPithecellobium
 Pithecellobium acatlense – palo fierro Pithecellobium dulce – guamuchil Pithecellobium lanceolatum – guamuchilillo, mochaquelitePlatymiscium
 Platymiscium lasiocarpumProsopis
 Prosopis laevigata – mesquite

Ramirezella
 Ramirezella crassa Ramirezella lozanii – cambara Ramirezella micrantha Ramirezella strobilophoraRhynchosia
 Rhynchosia discolor Rhynchosia edulis Rhynchosia minima Rhynchosia precatoria – colorin, ojo de perico Rhynchosia tarphanthaSchrankia
 Schrankia distachya – sierillaSenna
 Senna alata Senna atomaria – vainilla Senna centranthera Senna cobanensis Senna foetidissima var. grandiflora 
 Senna fruticosa Senna hirsuta var. hirta Senna mexicana 
 Senna mollissima 
 Senna multifoliolata var. multifoliolata 
 Senna obtusifolia Senna occidentalis – bichi Senna pallida Senna pendula var. advena 
 Senna pilifera var. subglabra 
 Senna quinquangulata var. quinquangulata Senna septemtrionalis Senna talpana Senna uniflora Senna villosaSphinctospermum
 Sphinctospermum constrictumStylosanthes
 Stylosanthes guianensisStylosanthes
 Stylosanthes guianensisTephrosia
 Tephrosia conzattii Tephrosia langlassei Tephrosia macrantha Tephrosia multifolia Tephrosia nicaraguensis Tephrosia sinapou Tephrosia submontana Tephrosia viridifloraTeramnus
 Teramnus uncinatusTrifolium
 Trifolium amabile – trébolVicia
 Vicia humilis Vicia pulchella subsp. mexicanaVigna
 Vigna adenantha Vigna linearisWillardia
 Willardia schiedeanaZapoteca
 Zapoteca formosa subsp. formosa Zapoteca formosa subsp. rosei Zapoteca tetragonaZornia
 Zornia reticulata Zornia thymifoliaLentibulariaceae
Pinguicula
 Pinguicula crenatiloba Pinguicula oblongiloba Pinguicula parvifoliaLoasaceae
Gronovia
 Gronovia scandens – mala mujer, hiedra, ortigaKlaprothia
 Klaprothia fasciculata – mala mujerMentzelia
 Mentzelia hispidaLoganiaceae
Spigelia
 Spigelia anthelmiaLoranthaceae
Cladocolea
 Cladocolea grahamii Cladocolea inconspicua Cladocolea inorna Cladocolea loniceroides Cladocolea sp.

Psittacanthus
 Psittacanthus calyculatus Psittacanthus palmeri Psittacanthus ramiflorus Psittacanthus schiedeanusStruthanthus
 Struthanthus condensatus Struthanthus interruptusLythraceae
Cuphea
 Cuphea appendiculata var. appendiculata Cuphea calaminthifolia Cuphea ferrisiae Cuphea hookeriana Cuphea inflata Cuphea jorullensis Cuphea leptopoda Cuphea llavea – cigarillo, perritos, pulmonaria Cuphea lobophora Cuphea lobophora var. lobophora Cuphea michoacana Cuphea tolucana Cuphea utriculosa Cuphea watsoniiHeimia
 Heimia salicifoliaMagnoliaceae
Magnolia
 Magnolia iltisiana: cloud forest – cacao, laurel, magnolia

Talauma
 Talauma sp. – cacao, yolocochitlMalpighiaceae
Bunchosia
 Bunchosia mcvaughii Bunchosia palmeri Bunchosia strigosaByrsonima
 Byrsonima crassifolia – nance, nancheEchinopterys
 Echinopterys eglandulosa – hierba de la cucarachaGalphimia
 Galphimia glauca Galphimia sp.

Gaudichaudia
 Gaudichaudia albida Gaudichaudia cycloptera Gaudichaudia cynanchoides Gaudichaudia mcvaughii Gaudichaudia subverticillataHeteropterys
 Heteropterys brachiata Heteropterys laurifolia – bjuco quipalero, palo bejucoso, palo de verduraLasiocarpus
 Lasiocarpus ferrugineusMalpighia
 Malpighia ovata Malpighia romeroana var. nayaritensis Malpighia wilburiorumMascagnia
 Mascagnia dipholiphylla Mascagnia sinemariensisTetrapterys
 Tetrapterys mexicanaMalvaceae
Abutilon
 Abutilon abutiloides – amantillo Abutilon barrancae Abutilon ellipticum Abutilon haenkeanum Abutilon reventum Abutilon trisulcatum – algondoncillo, mantilla Abutilon umbellatumAllosidastrum
 Allosidastrum hilarianum Allosidastrum pyramidatumAnoda
 Anoda acerifolia Anoda crenatiflora Anoda cristata – malva morada, violeta, violetilla Anoda maculataBriquetia
 Briquetia spicataGaya
 Gossypium
 Gossypium aridum Gossypium hirsutumHeliocarpus
 Heliocarpus terebinthaceusHerissantia
 Herissantia crispaHibiscus
 Hibiscus phoeniceus Hibiscus uncinellusHochreutinera
 Hochreutinera amplexifoliaKearnemalvastrum
 Kearnemalvastrum subtriflorumKosteletzkya
 Kosteletzkya tubifloraMalachra
 Malachra fasciataMalva
 Malva parviflora – malva Malva sylvestrisMalvastrum
 Malvastrum americanum – guinar Malvastrum coromandelianumMalvaviscus
 Malvaviscus arboreus var. arboreus Malvaviscus penduliflorusNeobrittonia
 Neobrittonia acerifolia – huevos de coyotePavonia
 Pavonia oxyphylla var. melanommata Pavonia pleurantheraPeriptera
 Periptera ctenotricha Periptera macrostelis Periptera puniceaPhymosia
 Phymosia roseaRobinsonella
 Robinsonella speciosaSida
 Sida abutilifolia Sida acuta Sida aggregata Sida barclayi Sida ciliaris Sida collina Sida glabra Sida haenkeana Sida jamaicensis Sida linifolia Sida rhombifolia – babosilla, escobita, guinar, huinar Sida rzedowskii Sida salviifolia Sida spinosa Sida abutilifolia Sida abutilifoliaWissadula
 Wissadula amplissimaMelastomaceae or Melastomataceae

Arthrostemma
 Arthrostemma alatum – yerbamoraClidemia
 Clidemia matudae Clidemia submontanaConostegia
 Conostegia volcanalis: cloud forest – pedorra Conostegia xalapensis – moraHeterocentron
 Heterocentron mexicanum Heterocentron subtriplinervium Heterocentron subtriplinervium sp. nov.Leandra
 Leandra cornoides Leandra subseriataMiconia
 Miconia albicans – morita, pedorra Miconia glaberrima Miconia mcvaughiiPterolepis
 Pterolepis pumilaTibouchina
 Tibouchina scabriuscula Tibouchina sp. nov.Meliaceae

Cedrela
 Cedrela odorata – cedro rojo Cedrela odorata sp. nov.Guarea
  Guarea glabraSwietenia
 Swietenia humilis – caoba, cobanoTrichilia
  Trichilia americana – periquillo  Trichilia havanensis  Trichilia trifoliataMenispermaceae
Cebatha
 Cebatha diversifoliaCissampelos
 Cissampelos pareira – colorín, ohode perico, orozulDisciphania
 Disciphania mexicanaMonimiaceae or Siparunaceae
Siparuna
 Siparuna andina – limoncillo, azagar, chumbejoMenispermaceae
Monotropa
 Monotropa hypopitys – pipa de indio, Indian pipes

Mimosoideae

Inga
 Inga vera subsp. eriocarpa: cloud forest – cuaniquilMoraceae
Brosimum
 Brosimum alicastrum – mojo, capomo, mojoteChlorophora
 Chlorophora tinctoraDorstenia
 Dorstenia drakena – gallito, barbudillaFicus
 Ficus cookii Ficus cotinifolia – amate negro, tescalama Ficus Ficus goldmanii – tescalama, zalate, zalaton Ficus insipida – higuera, amate, higuera blanca Ficus insipida var. insipida – camchin, higuera Ficus isophlebia Ficus lapathifolia – amate de hoja ancha Ficus maxima – higueron peluda Ficus microchlamys – higuera Ficus obtusifolia – higuerón Ficus pertusa – amatillo, camichin Ficus petiolaris Ficus pringlei Ficus tuerckheimii Ficus petiolaris – camichin Ficus sp. 1
 Ficus sp. 2
 Ficus sp. 3

Trophis
 Trophis noraminervae: gallery forest
 Trophis racemosa – ramoncilloMoraceae or Urticaceae
Cecropia
 Cecropia obtusifolia – guarumbo, huarumbo, huitapilCoussapoa
 Coussapoa purpusii – tescalamillaMyricaceae
Morella
 Morella cerifera – wax myrtle, falso encinoMyrsinaceae
Ardisia
 Ardisia compressa – capulin, capulincillo, cordoban Ardisia mexicana Ardisia revoluta – arrayán, cordoban, timbuche agrioGentlea
 Gentlea mcvaughiiParathesis
 Parathesis Ferruginea Parathesis villosa – mananita, timbuche cimarronRapanea
 Rapanea juergensenii – naranjillo;
 Rapanea myricoidesSynardisia
 Synardisia venosaMyrtaceae
Calyptranthes
 Calyptranthes pallens var. mexicana – murtaEugenia
 Eugenia capuli – capulín de mayo Eugenia crenularis Eugenia culminicola Eugenia petens Eugenia rekoiMyrcianthes
 Myrcianthes fragrans var. fragrans – lentiscoPsidium
 Psidium guajaba – guayaba Psidium guineense – guayaba cimarrón, guavea del cerro, guayabilla, guaybilla vendera Psidium sartorianum – arrayánNyctaginaceae
Boerhavia
 Boerhavia coccinea – abrojo rojoMirabilis
 Mirabilis jalapa – aretito, maravilla Mirabilis nyctagineaPisonia
 Pisonia aculeata var. aculeata – coma de uña, garabato, garabato prieto Pisonia arborescensPisoniella
 Pisoniella arborescensSalpianthus
 Salpianthus purpurascensOchnaceae
Ouratea
 Ouratea mexicanaOlacaceae
Ximenia
 Ximenia americana – ciruelilloOleaceae
Forestiera
 Forestiera reticulata Forestiera rhamnifoliaFraxinus
 Fraxinus uhdei: cloud forest

Osmanthus
 Osmanthus americanusOnagraceae

Epilobium
 Epilobium bonplandianumFuchsia
 Fuchsia arborescens: cloud forest
 Fuchsia cylindracea Fuchsia decidua Fuchsia fulgens – aretillo, chichile Fuchsia microphylla subsp. microphylla – coralillo, aretillo Fuchsia obconica Fuchsia thymifolia subsp. thymifoliaGaura
 Gaura hexandraLopezia
 Lopezia miniata subsp. miniata Lopezia racemosa subsp. racemosa – alfilerillo Lopezia riesenbachia Lopezia semeiandraLudwigia
 Ludwigia decurrens Ludwigia octovalvis – calaveraOenothera
 Oenothera kunthiana Oenothera pubescens – linda tarde Oenothera purpusii Oenothera rosea – hierba del golpe, linda artardecerOpiliaceae
Agonandra
 Agonandra racemosaOxalidaceae
Oxalis
 Oxalis alpina Oxalis corniculata Oxalis galeottii Oxalis hernandesii Oxalis jacquiniana – cañitas Oxalis macrocarpaPaperveraceae
Argemone
 Argemone ochroleuca – cardo santo, aceitilla, arnica blanca del campo, chicaloteBocconia
 Bocconia arborea – arbol de Juda, llora sangre Bocconia frutescens – barbascoPaperveraceae
Passiflora
 Passiflora biflora Passiflora exsudans Passiflora filipes Passiflora foetida – maracuyá silvestre Passiflora holosericea Passiflora jorullensis Passiflora pavonis Passiflora podadenia Passiflora porphyretica var. angustifolia Passiflora suberosa Passiflora sp. nov. 1
 Passiflora sp. nov. 2
 Passiflora sp.

Pedaliaceae or Martyniaceae

Martynia
 Martynia annua – gatitos, toritosProboscidea
 Proboscidea fragrans – hierba del toroPhytolaccaceae
LedenbergiaLedenbergia macranthaPetiveriaPetiveria alliacea – hierba del zorrillo, zorillo, caricillo silvestrePhytolaccaPhytolacca icosandra – jaboncillo, conguerin, quilitePhytolacca rugosa – higuerillaRivinaRivina humilis – bajatripaLedenbergiaTrichostigma octandrum – bejuco negroPiperaceae
PeperomiaPeperomia angularisPeperomia asarifoliaPeperomia campylotropaPeperomia angularis – pimienta de tierraPeperomia cyclophyllaPeperomia galioidesPeperomia glabellaPeperomia hispidulaPeperomia hoffmanniiPeperomia macrostachyaPeperomia martianaPeperomia mexicanaPeperomia molithrixPeperomia olivaceaPeperomia peltataPeperomia quadrifoliaPeperomia schizandraPeperomia tetraphyllaPeperomia sp. 1Peperomia sp. 2Peperomia sp. 3Peperomia sp. 4Peperomia sp. 5Peperomia sp. 6

PiperPiper abalienatumPiper amalago – cordoncillo hojaPiper brevipedicellatum – hierba del arlomo, hoja santaPiper jaliscanumPiper michelianum – hierba de arlomoPiper novogalicianumPiper pseudolindeniiPiper pseudofuligineumPiper rosei – hierba del arlomo, hoja santaPiper sanctum – acoyo, sacamantillaPiper stipulaceumPiper tuberculatumPiper umbellatum – acuya, hoja santa, sacamantillaPiper villiramulum – belencillo, cigarillo, cordoncilloPiper sp.

Plantaginaceae
PlantagoPlantago hirtella – lantenPlumbaginaceae
Plumbago
 Plumbago scandens – flor de pegajoso, hierba del cancer, pegajosoPodostemaceae
Podostemon
 Podostemon ceratophyllumPrimulaceae
Parathesis
 Parathesis villosa: cloud forest

Rhamnaceae

Rhamnus
 Rhamnus hintonii: cloud forest

Rosaceae

Alchemilla
 Alchemilla aphanoidesCrataegus
 Crataegus mexicana or Crataegus pubescens – Mexican hawthorn, tejocote, manzanita, tejocoteraPhotinia
 Photinia parviflora: gallery forest

Prunus
 Prunus cortapico: cloud forest, pine-oak forest
 Prunus serotina – black cherry

Rubus
 Rubus adenotrichos: secondary vegetation

Rubiaceae

Balmea
 Balmea stormiae: gallery forest

Chiococca
 Chiococca pachyphylla: gallery forest

Rondeletia
 Rondeletia manantlanensis: cloud forest

Sabiaceae

Meliosma
 Meliosma dentata: cloud forest

Salicaceae

Populus
 Populus guzmanantlensisSalix
 Salix bonplandiana Salix microphylla: gallery forest
 Salix paradoxaXylosma
 Xylosma flexuosa: cloud forest

Santalaceae or Viscaceae

Arceuthobium
 Arceuthobium globosum: vine

Phoradendron
 Phoradendron amplifolium: parasitic epiphyte – mistletoe
 Phoradendron brachystachyum: parasitic epiphyte – mistletoe
 Phoradendron carneum: parasitic epiphyte – mistletoe
 Phoradendron commutatum: parasitic epiphyte – mistletoe
 Phoradendron falcatum: parasitic epiphyte – mistletoe
 Phoradendron longifolium: parasitic epiphyte – mistletoe
 Phoradendron olivae: parasitic epiphyte – mistletoe
 Phoradendron quadrangulare: parasitic epiphyte – mistletoe
 Phoradendron olivae: parasitic epiphyte – mistletoe
 Phoradendron reichenbachianum: parasitic epiphyte – mistletoe
 Phoradendron robinsonii: parasitic epiphyte – mistletoe
 Phoradendron scaberrimum: parasitic epiphyte – mistletoe
 Phoradendron tetrapterum: parasitic epiphyte – mistletoe
 Phoradendron velutinum: parasitic epiphyte – mistletoe
 Phoradendron vernicosum: parasitic epiphyte – mistletoe

Sapindaceae and Aceraceae

Acer
 Acer binzayedii  – some authorities consider this a disjunct population of Acer skutchii or a  disjunct relict population of sugar maple (Acer saccharum), a much more northern species

Solanaceae

Solanum
 Solanum aligerumStyracaceae

Styrax
 Styrax argenteus: cloud forest
 Styrax ramireziiSymplocaceae

Symplocos
 Symplocos citraea Theaceae or Pentaphylacaceae 
Cleyera
 Cleyera integrifolia: cloud forest, gallery forest

Symplococarpon
 Symplococarpon purpussi: cloud forest

Ternstroemia
 Ternstroemia lineata – chico curiosoTiliaceae or Malvaceae 
Tilia
 Tilia mexicana or Tilia americana var. mexicana: cloud forest – sirimoTriumfetta
 Triumfetta barbosa: cloud forest

Ulmaceae or Cannabaceae

Aphanante
 Aphanante monoicaUrticaceae

Cecropia
 Cecropia obtusifoliaVerbenaceae

Citharexylum
 Citharexylum mocinoi: cloud forest

Lippia
 Lippia umbellata: cloud forest

Verbena
 Verbena carolinaViolaceae

Hybanthus
 Hybanthus attenuatus: herb
 Hybanthus elatus: herb
 Hybanthus mexicanus: herb

Viola
 Viola grahamii: herb
 Viola oxyodontis: herb

Vitaceae

Ampelocissus
 Ampelocissus acapulcensis: vine

Ampelopsis
 Ampelopsis mexicana: vine

Cissus
 Cissus cucurbitina: vine
 Cissus rhombifolia: vine – bejuco de agua, parilla, uva Cissus verticillata: vine – parillaParthenocissus
 Parthenocissus quinquefolia: vine – Virginia creeper

Vitis
 Vitis tiliifolia: vine – uvaZygophyllaceae

Guaiacum
 Guaiacum coulteri: tree – lignum vitae, palo fierroKallstroemia
 Kallstroemia maxima: shrub
 Kallstroemia rosei: shrub

Tribulus
 Tribulus cistoides: shrub

See also
List of birds of the Sierra de Manantlán Biosphere Reserve
Reptiles of the Sierra de Manantlán Biosphere Reserve

Notes

References
Balcazar Medina, Oscar Enrique, 2011. "Patrones geoecologicos de indendios forestales en la Reserva de la Biosfera Sierra de Manantlan". Tesis Universidad de Guadalajara
Cassell, B. A. (2012). "Fire History of the Sierra de Manantlán Biosphere Reserve in Western México", University of Washington.
Cerano-Paredes, J, J. Villanueva-Díaz, R. Cervantes-Martínez, P. Fulé, L. Yocom, G. Esquivel-Arriaga, E. Jardel-Peláez 2015. "Historia de incendios en un bosque de pino de la sierra de Manantlán, Jalisco, México". Bosque 36(1): 41-52, 2015 
 Figueroa-Rangel, B. L., et al. (2008). "4200 Years of Pine‐dominated Upland Forest Dynamics in West‐central Mexico: Human or Natural Legacy". Ecology 89(7): 1893-1907
Jardel Peláez, Enrique J., Gerardo Vélica Zúñiga, Oscar E. Balcázar Medina, Ramón Cuevas Guzmán, Eduardo Santana Castellón, Luis Manuel Martínez Rivera (2013). "Determinación De La Subzonificacion De La Reserva De La Biosfera Sierra De Manantlan". Departamento de Ecología y Recursos Naturales-IMECBIO, Centro Universitario de la Costa Sur, Universidad de Guadalajara, En colaboración con Dirección de la Reserva de la Biosfera Sierra de Manantlán, Comisión Nacional de Áreas Naturales Protegidas, Autlán, Jalisco. February 2013
Olvera-Vargas, M., et al. (2010). "Is there environmental differentiation in the Quercus-dominated forests of west-central Mexico?" Plant Ecology 211(2): 321-335.
Vargas-Rodriguez, Y. L. and W. J. Platt (2012). "Remnant sugar maple (Acer saccharum subsp. skutchii) populations at their range edge: Characteristics, environmental constraints and conservation implications in tropical America". Biological Conservation 150(1): 111-120.
Vazquez, Antonio and Ramon Cuevas (1989). "Una Nueva Especie Tropical De Populus (Sallcaceae) De La Sierra De Manantlan, Jalisco, Mexico". Acta Botánica Mexicana 8:39-45
Vazquez, J. A., R. Cuevas, T. S. Cochrane, H. H. Iltis, F. J. Santana, and L. Guzman (1995). Flora de Manantlán'', BRIT Press.

Lists of plants
Flora of Jalisco